Wabaseemoong is a First Nation reserve of the Wabaseemoong Independent Nations. It is in Kenora District, Ontario, Canada, close to the border with Manitoba. It used to be known as Islington 29.

References

Anishinaabe reserves in Ontario
Communities in Kenora District